Wisma Innoprise, is the state secretariat building for the Sabah state government. This building was built by Innoprise Corporation Sdn. Bhd (ICSB), an investment arm of Yayasan Sabah (Sabah Foundation). This building houses the offices for ICSB and also the Sabah chief minister's office at 18th floor.

See also

Kinabalu Tower
Tun Mustapha Tower
Sabah State Legislative Assembly Building

References

State secretariat buildings in Malaysia
Buildings and structures in Kota Kinabalu